Antônio Luiz Sampaio (born June 13, 1939), better known by his stage name Antônio Pitanga, is a Brazilian actor. He became internationally known for playing several roles on films of the Cinema Novo movement in the 1960s.

Personal life
He was married to actress Vera Manhães, with whom he had two sons: actress Camila Pitanga and actor Rocco Pitanga. After their divorced, he married politician Benedita da Silva.

Selected filmography
Films
Barravento (1962)
O Pagador de Promessas (1962)
The Guns (1964)
My Home Is Copacabana (1965)
Joanna Francesa (1973)
The Age of the Earth (1980)
Quilombo (1984)
La Mansión de Araucaima (1986)
Eternamente Pagú (1988)
Villa-Lobos: A Life of Passion (2000)
O Homem Que Desafiou o Diabo (2007)
Lula, The Son of Brasil (2009)
I'd Receive the Worst News from Your Beautiful Lips (2011)
Memory House (2020)

Television
Pantanal (1990)
A Próxima Vítima (1995)
O Clone (2001)
Celebridade (2003)
The Mutants: Pathways of the Heart (2008)
Cama de Gato (2009)
Rebelde (2011)

References

External links

1939 births
Living people
People from Salvador, Bahia
Afro-Brazilian male actors
Brazilian male film actors
Brazilian male stage actors
Brazilian male television actors
20th-century Brazilian male actors
21st-century Brazilian male actors